Taklu is a village in Hopang District, Wa Self-Administered Division of Myanmar.

Geography
Taklu is located in the mountainous area near the border with China, which lies east of the village. Mong Ling Shan mountain rises 4.5 km to the southeast.

See also
Wa States

References

External links
The border area (Wa region)
Earth-3D.com

Populated places in Shan State
Wa people